The Liu Song dynasty (420–479) was an imperial dynasty of China. 

Liu Song is also the name of:
Liu Song (table tennis) (born 1972), Chinese-born Argentine table tennis player
Liu Song (snooker player) (born 1983), Chinese snooker player